Pablo Muñoz Vega (23 May 1903 – 3 June 1994) was an Ecuadorian Roman Catholic prelate and cardinal and professed member from the Jesuits who served as the Archbishop of Quito from 1967 until his resignation in 1985.

His cause of canonization commenced on 9 April 2016 after the Congregation for the Causes of Saints granted their formal approval of the cause on 10 December 2015; this gives him the title Servant of God.

Life
Pablo Muñoz Vega was born in Mira on 23 May 1903 as the fourth child to Antonio Salustiano Muñoz Carrera and Josefa Vega. He was baptized on 24 May as "Segundo Pablo Mordoqueo".

He joined the Jesuits on 27 September 1918 (beginning his novitiate on 26 November 1918) and studied at the Jesuit houses for studies in Quito (such as the San Ignacio school in Cotocollao in 1915) and in 1922 obtained a bachelor's degree in humanities. He later studied from 1929 to 1930 in Belgium and then was transferred to Burgos in Spain at the Colegio Maximo de Oña; he also studied in Rome at the Pontifical Gregorian since September 1932. He studied humanities as well as Latin and Greek and obtained a degree from College Maximo San Ignacio in Quito in 1927 and then a doctorate from Facultad Teologia at the school of Oña in 1931. He acquired his doctorate in 1937 and was titled "Magister Aggregatus". Vega made his initial profession on 27 February 1920. Vega later taught at Cotocollao and later at the Jesuit school of San Felipe Neri in Riobamba from 1926 until 1928 and he began developing an interest and focus in the works of Saint Augustine who would become the basis for some of his spiritual writings.

Vega was ordained to the priesthood in 1933 in the Sant'Ignazio Church in Rome and commenced further studies there from 1933 until 1937. Once he completed his studies he served as a staff member in the philosophical department at the Gregorian from 1937 until 1949 at which point he was appointed as the Jesuit provincial for Ecuador later in 1958; he held that post until 1964. Vega also served as an expert at the Second Vatican Council in 1962 at the council's first session and would later then participate as a bishop in the second and third sessions of the council. He also served as the rector of the Pontifical Pio-Latin American College in Rome from 1955 until 1958 and served as the Rector Magnificus of the Pontifical Gregorian from 1958 until 1963.

Pope Paul VI appointed him as the Titular Archbishop of Ceramus (with the rank pro hac vice of archbishop since it was a titular see and not a titular archbishopric) and as the Coadjutor Archbishop "sedis datus" for the Quito archdiocese in 1964. He received his episcopal consecration on 19 March 1964 in Rome from Cardinal Carlo Confalonieri. He succeeded to the metropolitan see of Quito on 23 June 1967 after serving as its coadjutor which meant that he had the right of succession in that role.

He attended the final two sessions of the Second Vatican Council as a bishop from 1964 until 1965. He attended the 1967 gathering of bishops in Rome from 29 September to 29 October and also became the President of the Ecuadorian Episcopal Conference; he had two terms from 1969 to 1973 and then 1975 to 1984. He attended several other episcopal gatherings in Rome spanning the next decade.

Vega was made the Cardinal-Priest of San Roberto Bellarmino on 28 April 1969 and received his title on 30 April from Paul VI. He participated in the first conclave in 1978 that elected Pope John Paul I and the following conclave that October that saw the election of Pope John Paul II. In his role as a cardinal he was a member of both the Congregation for Catholic Education and the Congregation for Institutes of Consecrated Life and Societies of Apostolic Life.

In 1979 he attended the Third General Conference of the Latin American Episcopate in Puebla in Mexico and attended a gathering of the College of Cardinals from 5–9 November 1979. He lost the right to vote in conclaves after he turned 80 in 1983. He resigned from the pastoral governance of the archdiocese in 1985 as was a requirement of canon law. Vega also attended his last conference of the Latin American Episcopate in the Dominican Republic from 12 to 28 October 1992.

He died in his old see on 3 June 1994 and is buried in the archdiocesan cathedral.

Beatification process
On 21 February 2013 a formal request for the beatification process was lodged to the Congregation for the Causes of Saints in Rome. The C.C.S. granted their formal approval to the cause on 10 December 2015 with the declaration of "nihil obstat" (nothing against) to the cause. The diocesan process commenced on 9 April 2016 in Quito.

References

External links
 Hagiography Circle
 Catholic Hierarchy 
 The Cardinals of the Holy Roman Church
 

1903 births
1994 deaths
20th-century Ecuadorian educators
20th-century Roman Catholic archbishops in Ecuador
20th-century venerated Christians
Bishops appointed by Pope Paul VI
Cardinals created by Pope Paul VI
Ecuadorian cardinals
Ecuadorian Jesuits
Jesuit cardinals
Participants in the Second Vatican Council
Pontifical Gregorian University alumni
Academic staff of the Pontifical Gregorian University
Roman Catholic religious educators
Ecuadorian Servants of God
Roman Catholic archbishops of Quito